Tyreece Romayo John-Jules (born 14 February 2001) is an English professional footballer who plays as a striker for EFL League One club Ipswich Town, on loan from Arsenal. He has previously played for Lincoln City, Doncaster Rovers, Blackpool, and Sheffield Wednesday.

Early life
John-Jules was born in Westminster, Greater London. He began his football career with Charlton Athletic before joining Arsenal at the age of 8.

Club career

Arsenal 
John-Jules made his debut for Arsenal under-23s against Arsenal's North London derby rivals Tottenham Hotspur and scored in the match. He was part of the Arsenal under-18 team that reached the final of the 2017–18 FA Youth Cup.

John-Jules signed professional terms for Arsenal in 2018. In 2019, head coach Unai Emery selected him for the club's pre-season tour of the United States. He renewed his contract with the club in August 2019. Later in the year, he started to train with the first team squad at the request of Freddie Ljungberg, Arsenal's under-23 manager who was then the acting first team coach. On 29 August 2020, John-Jules was an unused substitute in the 2020 FA Community Shield, in which Arsenal clinched a 5–4 penalty shootout victory over Liverpool after the match ended 1–1.

Lincoln City (loan)
John-Jules was loaned to Lincoln City in January 2020. The move was done by the Arsenal head coach Mikel Arteta in order for John-Jules to get first team football in his preferred role as a striker. He made his Lincoln City debut against Shrewsbury Town. Lincoln City manager Michael Appleton praised John-Jules and said he could see him starting in Arsenal's first team in the future. He scored his first Football League goal against Blackpool in his next match. He was injured and ruled out for the rest of the season in March 2020. He subsequently returned to his parent club.

Doncaster Rovers (loan)
On 8 September 2020, John-Jules was loaned to Doncaster Rovers for the 2020–21 season. He scored his first goal for Doncaster in a 3–1 win against Charlton Athletic on 19 September 2020, for which he won the Sky Bet EFL Goal of the Month for League One.

Blackpool (loan)
John-Jules joined Blackpool on a season-long loan on 29 July 2021. He returned from the loan on 17 January 2022.

Sheffield Wednesday (loan)
On 25 January 2022, John-Jules joined Sheffield Wednesday on loan for the remainder of the season, to team up with manager Darren Moore once again. He made his debut on 29 January, coming off the bench against Ipswich Town.

Ipswich Town (loan)
On 22 June 2022, John-Jules joined Ipswich Town on a season-long loan.

International career
John-Jules has represented England at under-16, under-17, under-18 and under-19 level. In May 2018, John-Jules was a member of the side that hosted the 2018 UEFA European Under-17 Championship. The hosts were eliminated by the Netherlands at the semi-final stage on a penalty shootout with John-Jules scoring his spot kick. 

On 7 September 2021, John-Jules made his England U21 debut during the 2-0 2023 UEFA European Under-21 Championship qualification win over Kosovo U21s at Stadium MK.

He is also eligible to represent the Dominica national team as both his paternal grandparents are from Dominica.

Personal life
John-Jules is the nephew of actor Danny John-Jules, best known for playing Cat in the sci-fi comedy series Red Dwarf.

Career statistics

Honours
Arsenal
FA Community Shield: 2020

Individual
EFL League One Goal of the Month: September 2020

References

2001 births
Living people
Footballers from Westminster
English footballers
England youth international footballers
England under-21 international footballers
Association football forwards
Charlton Athletic F.C. players
Arsenal F.C. players
Lincoln City F.C. players
Doncaster Rovers F.C. players
Blackpool F.C. players
Sheffield Wednesday F.C. players
Ipswich Town F.C. players
English Football League players
Black British sportspeople
English people of Dominica descent